Hoghton railway station was a railway station in Lancashire that served the village of Hoghton.  It was situated on the East Lancashire Line between Preston and Blackburn.  It was closed in 1960.

The Blackburn and Preston Railway (B&PR) was authorised on 6 June 1844. It opened to passengers on 1 June 1846, with Hoghton being among the original stations. Goods traffic commenced on 1 June 1847, by which time the B&PR had amalgamated with the East Lancashire Railway. The station closed on 12 September 1960.

Notes

References

Disused railway stations in Chorley
Former Lancashire and Yorkshire Railway stations
Railway stations in Great Britain opened in 1846
Railway stations in Great Britain closed in 1960
Hoghton